The Green Man of Portland, also alternatively known as The Legend of the Green Man of Portland, is a 2009 art installation by artist Daniel Duford, located in Portland, Oregon, United States.

Description
Daniel Duford's The Green Man of Portland is a 2009 art installation consisting of two outdoor sculptures and eight "story markers" that form a poem. They are installed along ten blocks in Portland's Old Town Chinatown neighborhood. Materials include bronze, cast concrete, and porcelain enamel on steel. According to the artist, the work's imagery was inspired by 1970s horror comics and Works Progress Administration (WPA) posters. Duford has said of the installation:

The work is part of the City of Portland and Multnomah County Public Art Collection courtesy of the Regional Arts & Culture Council.

See also

 2009 in art
 Green Man

References

External links

 Old Town art via the Green Line by Larry Norton (August 18, 2009), The Oregonian
 The Legend of the Green Man of Portland at the Public Art Archive
 The Green Man of Portland #1 from The Naked Boy Part 3, Part 3 by Daniel Duford (2012)

2009 establishments in Oregon
2009 sculptures
Bronze sculptures in Oregon
Concrete sculptures in Oregon
Northwest Portland, Oregon
Old Town Chinatown
Outdoor sculptures in Portland, Oregon
Porcelain sculptures
Sculptures on the MAX Green Line
Steel sculptures in Oregon